The Possessed is a 1977 American supernatural horror television film directed by Jerry Thorpe and written by John Sacret Young. The film stars James Farentino as a former priest, now an exorcist, who battles Satanic forces that are threatening the students at a girls' high school. It also stars Claudette Nevins, Eugene Roche, Harrison Ford, Ann Dusenberry, Diana Scarwid, and Joan Hackett.

Plot 
Kevin Leahy, an alcoholic Catholic priest who has strayed from his faith, crashes his car and is pronounced dead at the scene. As penance, he is sent back to Earth to fight evil as an exorcist, and returns to life. At the Helen Page School, a Catholic all-girls college in Salem, Oregon, graduation season is near. The school is about to go coed. Ellen Sumner (Claudette Nevins), is a teacher at the school, which her daughter, Weezie, attends. One evening, the paper in Ellen's typewriter inexplicably bursts into flames.

Lane (Diana Scarwid), Alex (Carol Jones), Celia (Dinah Manoff), and Marty (P.J. Soles), play a prank on Weezie by smearing ketchup and other liquids under her bedsheets. Louise Gelson (Joan Hackett), who is Ellen's sister and headmistress of the college, enters and instructs the girls to leave. Weezie returns to her dorm in time to see the curtains suddenly burst into flames. She tells Ms. Gelson, who insists the girls must have been smoking.

During graduation practice, Lane's gown bursts into flames. Ellen and Paul Winjam (Harrison Ford), another teacher, put out the flames, but Lane is burned in the ordeal. Sergeant Taplinger (Eugene Roche) investigates, and Ellen tells him of the other random fires, insisting it is supernatural. Ellen seeks out Leahy to investigate the occurrences. Leahy and Ellen visit Lane in the hospital, where she is receiving treatment for burns to her legs.

Weezie confesses to Leahy that the night of the fire in her dorm, she had visited Mr. Winjam late to study for a biology test; he suspects they may be romantically involved. That night in the biology room, Weezie and Mr. Winjam meet, and his jacket bursts into flames; Weezie is locked out of the room, and watches through the window as he burns to death.

The next day Leahy finds Ms. Gelson crying hysterically in Winjam's office, and realizes she and Winjam had also been romantically involved. Ms. Gelson suspends classes, and several students leave the college. That night, Weezie encounters Ms. Gelson wandering erratically through the hallways of the school; Ms. Gelson screams, and slaps her. Weezie tells Leahy of the incident, and then confesses to her mother about the affair with Winjam. Leahy searches the school for Ms. Gelson, and Ellen and Weezie begin to smell smoke.

The remaining girls on campus, who have congregated in one of the dormitories, also begin to smell smoke, and find themselves locked in. Ms. Gelson unlocks the rooms and leads them away. Leahy searches the dormitory, and finds all of the rooms empty. He frees Ellen and Weezie from Ellen's locked office, and they attempt to leave the school.

They encounter the possessed Ms. Gelson at the college's swimming pool, surrounded by the girls. Ellen forces all of the girls to leave the room, and Ms. Gelson grabs Leahy, lighting his jacket on fire, but the fire extinguishes itself. Ms. Gelson, laughing wildly, spits nails at Leahy. He embraces her, and again catches fire; he jumps into the swimming pool, and disappears in a blaze.

The college is reopened for graduation, and Taplinger inquires to Ellen about Leahy's identity and whereabouts. She tells him she does not know who he really was or where he went. Lane is able to return to school for the graduation ceremony, led by a healthy Ms. Gelson.

Cast

Production
Filming of The Possessed took place in January 1977 on the campus of Reed College in southeast Portland, Oregon. The production reportedly accrued $400,000 in local revenue for the state of Oregon.

Release 
The Possessed was first broadcast on NBC on May 1, 1977.

Critical response
Bill Mandel of The San Francisco Examiner panned the film, referring to the script as "nearly incomprehensible...  the evil most evident in this turkey was in the producers' minds."

Steve Barton of Dread Central rated it 3.5/5 stars and called it a "token TV movie Exorcist knock-off" that is "actually ridiculously entertaining."  Paul Mavis of DVD Talk rated it 4/5 stars and called it an "extremely effective made-for-TV supernatural horror film."

References

External links 
 

1977 films
1977 horror films
1977 television films
1970s high school films
1970s supernatural horror films
American high school films
American horror television films
American supernatural horror films
Films about exorcism
Films about Satanism
Films about spirit possession
Films scored by Leonard Rosenman
Films set in Oregon
Films shot in Portland, Oregon
Demons in film
Resurrection in film
NBC network original films
Warner Bros. films
1970s English-language films
Films directed by Jerry Thorpe
1970s American films